Lowell Charles Kilday (February 20, 1931 – August 6, 2011) was an American diplomat who served as United States ambassador to the Dominican Republic and director of the Office of Brazilian Affairs.

Early life and education
Born to William and Helga Kilday in New Hope, Wisconsin, he grew up in Milwaukee, Wisconsin and graduated from North Division High School in 1948. Kilday joined the United States Army in 1950 and served a tour of duty in Korea during the Korean War as a member of the 1st Cavalry Division. Returning to the United States, he attended the University of Wisconsin–Madison, where he earned a Bachelor of Science degree in political science.

Career 
After graduating from college, Kilday joined the United States Foreign Service. He served tours in Cuba, Brazil, Dominican Republic, Vietnam, Angola and Costa Rica before being appointed Ambassador in 1985 by President Ronald Reagan appointed Lowell as his Ambassador to the Dominican Republic. At the end of his career, he was awarded the rank of Career Minister, the highest regular senior rank for a Foreign Service Officer.

Death 
Kilday died in Springfield, Virginia in 2011.

References

1931 births
2011 deaths
People from Portage County, Wisconsin
Military personnel from Milwaukee
People from Springfield, Virginia
 University of Wisconsin–Madison College of Letters and Science alumni
Ambassadors of the United States to the Dominican Republic
North Division High School (Milwaukee) alumni